LINQPad is a software utility targeted at .NET Framework and .NET Core development.  It is used to interactively query SQL databases (among other data sources such as OData or WCF Data Services) using LINQ, as well as interactively writing C# code without the need for an IDE. This expands its use to a general "test workbench" where C# code can be quickly prototyped outside of Visual Studio.  It can also be used to write code in the VB.NET, SQL and F# languages.

This product is freemium, keeping the C# auto-complete feature disabled until the user purchases a license.

LINQPad supports the following LINQ dialects:

 Entity Framework
 LINQ to Objects 
 LINQ to SQL 
 LINQ to XML

References

External links 
 
 LINQPad Extensions

LINQPad